Vihula is a village in Haljala Parish, Lääne-Viru County, in northern Estonia, within Lahemaa National Park.

Vihula manor
The earliest references to an estate go back to 1501. During much of its history, it has belonged to Baltic German aristocratic families. During the Soviet occupation of Estonia, the manor housed a collective farm. The present main building, designed by Friedrich Modi, dates from after 1892, when the earlier house was destroyed in a fire. It is an irregular building with neo-Renaissance details. Several of the older outbuildings, such as a palm house and a "coffee house", also survive and together contribute to the present ensemble.

See also
 Lahemaa National Park

References

External links
Vihula Manor official homepage
Vihula manor at Estonian Manors Portal

Villages in Lääne-Viru County
Kreis Wierland